The men's rugby sevens tournament at the 2018 Commonwealth Games was the sixth time in history that the event has taken place since it started in 1998. The venue for the competition was Robina Stadium.

For the first time since 2002 the men's tournament saw some minor alterations to the format. The competition retained its 16 team first round pool stage format however the quarter-final stage was removed so only the teams who finished as pool winners went through to contest for the medals with teams who come runners-up in their pools going through the newly formed lower classification stage and all remaining teams who finished third and fourth respectively were eliminated.

Qualification 
Malaysia and Sri Lanka both qualified for the tournament via the 2017 Asia Rugby Sevens Series on 15 October 2017, finishing seventh and fourth respectively. On 26 November 2017, Jamaica qualified for the first time beating Guyana 24–28. The tournament being held in Mexico City, Mexico.

Qualified teams

Competition schedule

The following is the competition schedule for the Men’s Rugby sevens competition:

Match officials
World Rugby announced a panel of eight match officials on 21 February 2018 for the men's sevens.

 Craig Evans (Wales)
 Sam Grove-White (Scotland)
 Richard Haughton (England)
 Richard Kelly (New Zealand)
 Jordan Way (Australia)
 Damon Murphy (Australia)
 Rasta Rasivhenge (South Africa)
 Tevita Rokovereni (Fiji)

Pool stage
In pool play, each team plays one match against the other three teams in the group.

Pool winners advance to the semi-finals, runners-up advance to the lower classification matches (for places 5 to 8) and the remaining teams are eliminated from competition.

On 1 February 2018, the pools for both the men's & women's tournaments were confirmed.

Pool A

Pool B

Pool C

Pool D

Knockout stage

Lower classification round

Medal round

Rankings
The retrospective rankings of the tournament are tallied below.

References

Rugby sevens at the 2018 Commonwealth Games